Russell John Fitzgerald (born October 4, 1972) is an American former professional ice hockey center.  He was drafted in the second round, 38th overall, by the Pittsburgh Penguins in the 1991 NHL Entry Draft.

Fitzgerald played twenty-five games in the National Hockey League with the Penguins in the 1994–95 and 1995–96 seasons.  He scored two goals and two assists.

Personal life
Russell played youth hockey in Silver Bay, Minnesota while being coached by Jim McLeod. His younger brother Zack Fitzgerald is currently the Head Coach and Director of Hockey for the Glasgow Clan of the Elite Ice Hockey League.

Career statistics

Regular season and playoffs

External links

1972 births
American men's ice hockey centers
Cleveland Lumberjacks players
Frankfurt Lions players
Ice hockey people from Minneapolis
Iserlohn Roosters players
Living people
Manitoba Moose (IHL) players
Minnesota Duluth Bulldogs men's ice hockey players
Pittsburgh Penguins draft picks
Pittsburgh Penguins players
Quad City Mallards (UHL) players
San Diego Gulls (WCHL) players